Kepler-90e is an exoplanet orbiting the star Kepler-90, located in the constellation Draco. It was discovered by the Kepler telescope in October 2013. It orbits its parent star at only 0.42 astronomical units away, and at its distance it completes an orbit once every 91.94 days.

References

Transiting exoplanets
Exoplanets discovered by the Kepler space telescope
Draco (constellation)
Exoplanets discovered in 2013